Honeymoon Creek Snow-Survey Cabin, also known as Seven Lakes Cabin, near Ashland, Oregon, was built in 1943.  It was listed on the National Register of Historic Places in 2000.

It was deemed significant for its association with the Bureau of Agricultural Engineering/Soil Conservation Service's snow-survey program in southwestern Oregon.  The cabin was not part of the first period of SCS snow-survey cabin construction in the 1930s, but it was built in the same design and by the same persons as built the first such cabin at South Lake.

The Honeymoon Creek Snow-Survey Cabin is located in the Butte Falls Ranger District, in Klamath County. The Whaleback Snow-Survey Cabin (1937), in the Prospect Ranger District in Douglas County, is also NRHP-listed.

See also
National Register of Historic Places listings in Klamath County, Oregon

References

1943 establishments in Oregon
Buildings and structures in Klamath County, Oregon
Houses completed in 1943
National Register of Historic Places in Klamath County, Oregon
Rogue River-Siskiyou National Forest